Patuxent is an unincorporated community in Charles County, Maryland, United States. Maxwell Hall was listed on the National Register of Historic Places in 1974. The name Patuxent  is the name attributed to all five rivers found by the explores —it literally means “many rivers “——-

References

Unincorporated communities in Charles County, Maryland
Unincorporated communities in Maryland